Horácio Delfim Dias de Faria (born 2 December 1947) is a former Portuguese football player.

He played 14 seasons and 313 games in the Primeira Liga for Leixões and Varzim.

Club career
He made his Primeira Liga debut for Leixões on 18 September 1966 in a game against Sanjoanense.

On 14 December 1969, he scored 5 goals for Leixões against Boavista.

References

1947 births
Sportspeople from Matosinhos
Living people
Portuguese footballers
Leixões S.C. players
Primeira Liga players
Varzim S.C. players
S.C. Salgueiros players
Association football forwards